Yelverton may refer to:

Places
 Yelverton, Devon, England
 Yelverton, Norfolk, England
 Yelverton, Ohio, a community in the United States
 Yelverton, Ontario, Canada
 Yelverton, Western Australia, Australia
 Yelverton Inn and Store, Chester, New York State
 Yelverton Lodge, London, England
 Yelverton Pass, a pass on Ellesmere Island, Nunavut, Canada
 Anthony Yelverton House, Highland, New York State
 Yelverton, Marlborough in the Marlborough District of the South Island of New Zealand

People
 Anne Yelverton (1628–1698), Countess of Manchester and Countess of Halifax
 Barbara Yelverton, later Barbara Rawdon-Hastings, Marchioness of Hastings (1810–1858), English fossil collector and geologist
 Charlie Yelverton (born 1948), American professional basketball player
 Christopher Yelverton (1536–1612), English Speaker of the House of Commons
 Sir Christopher Yelverton, 1st Baronet (1602–1654), English politician
 Hastings Yelverton (1808–1877), British Royal Navy officer and politician
 Henry Yelverton (Australian politician) (1854–1906), Western Australian Legislative Council, 1901–1904
 Henry Yelverton (merchant), Australian timber merchant
 Henry Yelverton, 19th Baron Grey de Ruthyn (1780–1810), friend of Lord Byron
 James W. Yelverton (1869–1950), New York politician
 Theresa Yelverton (1830s–1881), English woman involved in the Yelverton case
 William Yelverton (1400–1470s), judge in Norfolk and MP for Great Yarmouth 1435–1436

Other
 Yelverton case, a nineteenth-century Irish law case
 Yelverton baronets, both in the Baronetage of England

See also
 Viscount Avonmore, a title held by the Yelverton family
 Henry Yelverton (disambiguation)